Abokado is a fast food chain based in the United Kingdom.

The chain was founded by Mark Lilley and his wife Lindsay in 2004, with the first store opening in London's Covent Garden.

As of September 2015 it had 26 stores in London. In September 2015, Mark Lilley, director of Abokado, announced that they would be following Jamie Oliver's example and introduce a sugar tax on sweetened drinks sold in the chain.

In 2019, the company announced it will be launching a Company Voluntary Arrangement (CVA), after having suffered a "significant sophisticated online banking fraud" in July. At present, it is unclear how many sites of the brand will be closed under the CVA.

The company was sold in a pre-pack administration in October 2020; as a result of the impact of COVID-19. Founder Mark Lilley is CEO of the new owners, Montway Holdings Ltd.

References

2004 establishments in England
British brands
Fast-food chains of the United Kingdom
British companies established in 2004
Restaurants established in 2004